The A3 is a major metropolitan arterial route in Sydney, formerly designated Metroad 3. The A3 runs from its intersection with the A8 at Mona Vale at the north end, to the southerly of its two intersections with the A1, Princes Highway, at Blakehurst.

It is a major connector between most of the major radial routes emanating from central Sydney, and a major link between the northern and southern parts of the Sydney tolled orbital freeway. It is the most direct, although not necessarily the quickest, route across Sydney between the South Coast and the North Coast. It is one of only three road connections between the Northern Beaches region of Sydney and the rest of Sydney (the other two being route A38 (Warringah Road) and the A8.

Most of the route has been progressively upgraded to three lanes in each direction (although parking is permitted in the kerbside lanes in some sections). Sections which are only two lanes in each direction remain, between Beverley Hills and South Hurstville, along Homebush Bay Drive, and between St Ives and Terry Hills. Between Mona Vale and Terry Hills, most of the eastern section of Mona Vale Road is only 1 lane in each direction. Much of the route becomes very congested in peak hour.

The name "A3" is the route allocation for the route as a whole, not a road name. The A3 route runs along a whole series of differently named roads. From north to south they are:
 Mona Vale Road
 Ryde Road
 Lane Cove Road
 Devlin Street
 Church Street
 Concord Road
 Homebush Bay Drive
 Centenary Drive
 Roberts Road
 Wiley Avenue
 King Georges Road

Route

The scheduled state route for the A3 begins in the south at the junction with Princes Highway (A1), in the suburb of Blakehurst. From here, the A3 is called King Georges Road. Crossing Punchbowl Road, which is the border between Wiley Park and Greenacre, the A3 continues via Wiley Avenue for a short distance before joining Roberts Road. Near the junction with the Hume Highway (Liverpool Road) in Strathfield South, the A3 continues via an overpass onto Centenary Drive. Marlborough Road, which serves as an on-off ramp in the vicinity of the Flemington markets, and the associated loop road, is part of the route designation. At the intersection with the M4 motorway in the suburb of Homebush West, the A3 becomes Homebush Bay Drive. Homebush Bay Drive joins Concord Road in the suburb of Concord West. The A3 designation continues on Concord Road. Concord Road crosses Parramatta River via Ryde Bridge. North of the river, the route continues northeast as Church Street, but at the intersection with Victoria Road it veers left to join Devlin Street. The new route gazetted in 1993 ends at the intersection of Devlin Street with Blaxland Road, in the suburb of Ryde. North of Blaxland Road, the route continues as gazetted in 1976 via Lane Cove Road. It crosses the Lane Cove River via De Burghs Bridge. North of Lane Cove River, the route continues as Ryde Road. North of the junction with Pacific Highway (A1), the route continues via Mona Vale Road until the end of the route at Mona Vale, at the junction with Pittwater Road (A8).

History
The passing of the Main Roads Act of 1924 through the Parliament of New South Wales provided for the declaration of Main Roads, roads partially funded by the State government through the Main Roads Board (later the Department of Main Roads, and eventually Transport for NSW). Main Road No. 139 was declared along Devlin Street between Gladesville Road (today Blaxland Road) in Ryde (and continuing northwards via Eastwood and Epping to the intersection with Pennant Hills Road in Pennant Hills), Main Road No. 162 was declared along Wicks, Pittwater and Lane Cove Roads through Ryde, Ryde Road through Gordon, then via St. Ives to the intersection with Pittwater Road in Mona Vale, and Main Road No. 200 was declared from the intersection of Great Western Highway and Concord Road in Concord, along Concord Road to Parramatta River (using the punt service between Rhodes and Meadowbanks) then along Bowden Street to Parramatta Road (today Victoria Road), on the same day, 8 August 1929. The punt service across Parramatta River was replaced by Ryde Bridge in 1935, changing the alignment to today's route along Church Street to Ryde; Ryde Council constructed a new alignment through Ryde, changing from Wicks and Pittwater Roads to today's Lane Cove Road in September 1961.

What is now called A3 was initially designated to become a major north–south metropolitan arterial route in 1964, when the route incorporating several existing local arterial roads was designated as 'Ring Road 3'. After 1964, upgrading projects were commenced, with the construction of new De Burghs Bridges over the Lane Cove River between Pymble and Ryde (1967). It was subsequently re-designated 'State Route 33' in 1974. A grade-separated crossing was constructed at Epping Road at North Ryde (1978).

Prior to 1983, around the Strathfield area the A3 route passed through the Strathfield town centre, proceeding along (north to south) Concord Road, the Boulevarde, Coronation Parade and Punchbowl Road, to join King Georges Road. The part of this route that passes through Strathfield town centre was very congested and also problematical to widen. A major deviation of this part of the route was built between 1983 and 1998, relocating the arterial route to the west between Rhodes and Wiley Park, to bypass the Strathfield bottleneck and improve access to the Olympic Precinct at Homebush Bay. Called the "Strathfield Bypass" at the time, the deviation route includes the new Homebush Bay Drive and Centenary Drive (named for the centenary of Strathfield Municipality), and an upgraded Roberts Road though Chullora and Greenacre, connecting to King Georges Road near Wiley Park. The road upgrades, new bridges and connections for this deviation were completed in stages between 1983 and 1998. The original route was subsequently given the route allocation State Route 27 which was decommissioned in 2004.

Also during this period, Ryde Bridge over the Parramatta River between Ryde and Rhodes was duplicated (1988), grade-separate crossings were constructed at the Pacific Highway at Pymble (grade separation completed in 1989).

The whole route was re-designated 'Metroad 3' after April 1993. It is the only one of Sydney's 'Metroad' routes that has not changed alignment since the Metroad system was adopted in 1993. In August 2013, as part of the alphanumeric route scheme, Metroad 3 was decommissioned and was designated A3.

As a major access route to Sydney Olympic Park, a grade-separated crossing was constructed at the M4 Western Motorway and Parramatta Road, at Flemington (1992) and the intersection with Australia Avenue and Underwood Road at Homebush (1998). Grade-separated crossings were also constructed at M2 Hills Motorway at Macquarie Park (1997),  at Victoria Road at Top Ryde (1998), the Hume Highway at Chullora (1998), and the M5 South Western Motorway at Beverly Hills (2001).

Many projects have been undertaken over the decades to widen most of the route in stages to three lanes each way, although no proper freeway sections have ever been constructed.

See also

References 

Sydney Metroads